Martin Thomsen may refer to:
 Martin Thomsen (footballer, born 1980), Danish football defender
 Martin Thomsen (footballer, born 1982), Danish football midfielder
 Martin Thomsen (referee), referee in football competitions such as the Telekom Cup

See also
 Martin Thompson (disambiguation)